Sun Yong Kim-Manzolini (born 18 May 1961) is a Korean- American businesswoman and entrepreneur. She is also known for hosting seminars to empower women to be independent.

Early life and career 
Kim-Manzolini was born on May 18, 1961 in Korea. She spent some of her childhood in an orphanage. At the age of 15, she was adopted by an American family. Sun Yong attended University of Utah where she studied Nursing and graduated. After her education, she worked in the field for over 30 years. She is the founder and owner of Intermountain Adult Day Care Center.

References 

Living people
1961 births
Korean businesspeople
American businesspeople
21st-century American businesswomen
21st-century American businesspeople